Nuñomoral is the head village of a municipality of the same name located in the center of the comarca of Las Hurdes, province of Cáceres, Extremadura, Spain. According to the 2006 census (INE), the municipality has a population of 1,494 inhabitants. The Hurdano River flows through the area.

Alquerías
The following alquerías (small settlements of a few houses) are within the municipal limits of Nuñomoral (traditional variants of the name are in brackets):
Aceitunilla
Asegur (L’Asegul)
Batuequilla (La Batuequilla)
Cerezal (El Cerezal)
La Fragosa
El Gasco (El Gascu)
Horcajada (La Horcajá)
Martilandrán
Rubiaco (El Rubiacu)
Vegas de Coria (Vegas)

History 
The church of Nuestra Sra. de la Asunción, built in masonry, is one of the few historical buildings in the area. In Asegur there are still some local houses with the traditional shale roof.

In former times the village of Ladrillar located to the north was part of the Nuñomoral area.

See also
Las Hurdes

References

External links
Wikiloc - Vegas de Coria a Nuñomoral trail

Municipalities in the Province of Cáceres
Las Hurdes